An electoral redistribution in British Columbia is underway by the BC Electoral Boundaries Commission.  On October 21, 2021, the Government of British Columbia appointed Justice Nitya Iyer, Linda Tynan and Chief Electoral Officer Anton Boegman to serve as the 2021 commissioners. Justice Iyer was appointed the chair.

The commission is required to complete redistricting every two election cycles. The final number of provincial electoral districts, and thus seats in the next legislature, will not be known until redistricting has occurred. The commission is required to complete its preliminary report by October 21, 2022, and its final report six months later.

In May 2021, the government introduced legislation that removed a requirement that no reduction of seats could be considered for certain rural regions. Attorney General David Eby said the changes were necessary to ensure the commission was independent and had the flexibility to recommend boundaries that provide effective representation. The legislation also permits the legislature to grow to up to 93 seats. 

In February 2022, the commission opened public consultations for the redistribution. Public hearings were scheduled and public submissions were open until May 31, 2022. Following the release of its initial report in October 2022, further consultations will occur before its final report is submitted to the government.

Initial report
The initial report, published on October 3, 2022, proposed a total of 93 electoral districts, up from 87 districts. Six new ridings were proposed for areas with rapid population growth, with an additional 71 ridings having their boundaries adjusted to accommodate for geographic, demographic, and other concerns.

Burnaby–New Westminster–Tri-Cities
An additional district, Burnaby Centre, was proposed for the Burnaby–New Westminster–Tri-Cities area.

New Westminster was found to have a population too large for a single riding but too small for two ridings. The initial report split the city into 5 ridings, sharing 2 electoral districts with Burnaby and 1 electoral district with Richmond.

 Burnaby Centre, new riding
 Burnaby East, lost Eastburn
 Burnaby-New Westminster gained portions of New Westminster from New Westminster-Maillardville
 Burnaby North, lost portions north of Highway 1 to Burnaby Centre
 Burnaby South, redrawn to include the SkyTrain corridor in a single riding
 Coquitlam-Burke Mountain, lost Westwood Plateau to Port Moody-Westwood Plateau
 Coquitlam-Mundy Park, previously named Coquitlam-Maillardville, gained the Kwikwetlem First Nation from Port Coquitlam to ensure both Kwiketlem reserves are in the same electoral district, lost Maillardville to New Westminster-Maillardville
 New Westminster-Maillardville, previously named New Westminster, lost portions to Burnaby-New Westminster, gained Maillardville from Coquitlam-Maillardville
 Port Coquitlam, lost the Kwikwetlem First Nation to Coquitlam-Mundy Park to ensure both Kwiketlem reserves are in the same electoral district
 Port Moody-Westwood Plateau, mostly consists of the existing Port Moody-Coquitlam

Fraser Valley–Langley–Maple Ridge
The Fraser Valley–Langley–Maple Ridge area gained an additional electoral district, Langley-Willoughby.
 Abbotsford-Mission, lost portions of Abbotsford, gained portions of Mission
 Abbotsford South, lost portions west of Bradner Road to Langley-Aldergrove
 Abbotsford West, lost portions west of Bradner Road and north of the Trans-Canada highway to Langley-Aldergrove
 Chilliwack-Cultus Lake, renamed and consists mostly of portions of Chilliwack-Kent south of the Fraser River, lost District of Kent and Harrison Hot Springs to Fraser-Nicola
 Chilliwack North, reorganized from Chilliwack, gained communities north of the Fraser River around Harrison Lake from Chiliwack-Cultus Lake
 Langley-Aldergrove, previously named Langley East, gained Aldergrove
 Langley-Murrayville, previously named Langley, gained Murrayville
 Langley-Willoughby, new riding created from portions of Langley and Langley East
 Maple Ridge East, previously named Maple Ridge-Mission, lost portions of Mission to Abbotsford-Mission.
 Maple Ridge-Pitt Meadows, lost Yennadon to Maple Ridge East

Interior BC
Interior BC gained an additional electoral district, Kelowna-Centre.
 Kelowna Centre, new riding made mostly from Kelowna West
 Kelowna-Lake Country boundary extended northwards
 Kamloops-Mission, portions moved into Kelowna Centre
 West Kelowna-Peachland, previously named Kelowna West, lost downtown Kelowna to Kelowna Centre, redrawn to include portions of the District of Peachland
 Boundary-Similkameen, lost Christina Lake to Kootenay West
 Fraser-Nicola, gained District of Kent and Harrison Hot Springs
 Kamloops Centre, portions transferred to Fraser-Nicola and Kamloops-North Shuswap
 Kamloops-North Shuswap, gained North Shuswap, lost portions of downtown Kamloops to Kamloops Centre
 Penticton-Summerland, lost Peachland to West Kelowna-Peachland
 Salmon Arm-Shuswap, lost North Shuswap Lake and Seymour Arm to Kamloops-North Shuswap
 Vernon-Monashee, lost Beachcomber Bay, East Bella Vista Highlands, and Okanagan Lake to Kelowna-Lake Country

Kootenays
The commission initially considered reducing the number of ridings in the region from 4 to 3, but ultimately decided against it, citing effective representation.
 Columbia River-Revelstoke, gained Cranbrook's western outskirts
 Kootenay Central, previously named Nelson-Creston, gained Christina Lake, lost Nakusp, New Denver, and Silverton from Kootenay West
 Kootenay East, portions of Cranbrook lost to Columbia River-Revelstoke
 Kootenay West, gained Christina Lake, lost Nakusp, New Denver, and Silverton to Kootenay Central

Northern BC
The commission initially considered merging the two Peace River ridings, as well as North Coast with Skeena, but ultimately decided not to in consideration of the great size of the ridings. Minor changes were made to the water boundaries of the ridings.
Bulkley Valley-Stikine, previously named Stikine
Nechako Lakes, no changes
North Coast, no major changes
Peace River North, no major changes
Peace River South, no changes
Skeena, no changes

North Shore–Sea to Sky–Sunshine Coast
No new districts were added to the region. Four of five districts had their boundaries adjusted.
 North Vancouver-Lonsdale, lost North Lonsdale and portions of Lynn Creek to North Vancouver-Seymour
 North Vancouver-Seymour, gained North Lonsdale and portions of Lynn Creek from North Vancouver-Lonsdale
 Powell River-Sunshine Coast, no changes proposed
 West Vancouver-Capilano, boundaries extended
 West Vancouver-Sea to Sky, boundary with West Vancouver-Capilano adjusted

Prince George and the Cariboo
The two Cariboo ridings were considered for merging, but adjustments to the ridings were ultimately chosen as the solution to bring each riding into the deviation. All four ridings were ultimately redrawn as a result. There was consideration of bringing the Bella Coola valley into Cariboo-North Thompson, but this was ultimately scrapped as the North Coast riding's population was already below deviation.
 Cariboo-North Thompson
 Prince George-Cariboo 
 Prince George-Mackenzie 
 Prince George-Valemount

Richmond–Delta
Discussions on whether Queensborough should be transferred to a New Westminster riding gave no concerns regarding representation; only minor changes were proposed to the Richmond–Delta area.
 Delta North, lost portions south of 64th Avenue to Delta South
 Delta South, gained portions south of 64th Avenue from Delta North
 Richmond-Bridgeport, previously named Richmond North Centre, lost Bridgeport and neighbourhoods east of No. 2 Road and south of Westminster Highway
 Richmond Centre, previously named Richmond South Centre, lost areas south of Blundell and west of Gilbert into Richmond-Steveston
 Richmond-Queensborough, lost Bridgeport to Richmond-Bridgeport
 Richmond-Steveston, gained areas south of Blundell and west of Gilbert from Richmond-Centre

Surrey
Surrey gained an additional electoral district.
 Surrey Central, new electoral district, created from portions of Surrey-Newton, Surrey-Panorama, and Surrey-Cloverdale
 Surrey City Centre, new electoral district, mostly contains portions of Surrey-Whalley 
 Surrey East, previously named Surrey-Cloverdale, gained portions of Cloverdale from Surrey South
 Surrey-Fleetwood, adjustments made to the southern and eastern boundaries
 Surrey-Guildford, adjustments made to the southern boundary
 Surrey-Newton, adjusted to include portions of Surrey-Green Timbers and Surrey-Newton
 Surrey North, created from portions of Surrey-Whalley and Surrey-Green Timbers, lost downtown Surrey to Surrey City Centre, gained portions of Newton
 Surrey-Panorama, portions transferred to Surrey South
 Surrey South, gained portions from Surrey Panorama, lost portions of Cloverdale to Surrey-Cloverdale
 Surrey-White Rock, no changes

Vancouver
Vancouver gained an additional electoral district, Vancouver-South Granville.

Name changes were proposed due to concerns raised about the distinct identities of Vancouver's neighbourhoods, and the commission's boundaries reflect these suggestions. 5 ridings had their names changed as a result.

 Vancouver-Fraserview, lost the Sunset neighbourhood to Vancouver-Langara
 Vancouver-Hastings, no changes
 Vancouver-Kensington, portions transferred to Vancouver-Little Mountain
 Vancouver-Langara, gained Sunset neighbourhood from Vancouver-Fraserview
 Vancouver-Little Mountain, previously named Vancouver-Fairview
 Vancouver-Point Grey, lost portions to Vancouver-South Granville
 Vancouver-Quilchena, lost portions to Vancouver-Point Grey
 Vancouver-South Granville, gained portions from Vancouver-Point Grey
 Vancouver-Strathcona, previously named Vancouver-Mount Pleasant, lost Gastown to Vancouver-Yaletown and southern Mount Pleasant to Vancouver-Little Mountain
 Vancouver-Trout Lake, previously named Vancouver-Kingsway, lost portions of southern Kingsway to Vancouver-Kensington
 Vancouver-West End, no changes
 Vancouver-Yaletown, previously named Vancouver-False Creek, lost southern False Creek to Vancouver-Little Mountain and Vancouver-South Granville, gained Gastown from Vancouver-Strathcona

Vancouver Island
Vancouver Island gained an additional electoral district, Langford-Highlands.
Esquimalt-Colwood, previously named Esquimalt-Metchosin, lost Metchosin to Juan de Fuca-Malahat, gained Victoria West from Victoria-Beacon Hill
Juan de Fuca-Malahat, combined rural communities along the Strait of Juan de Fuca
Langford-Highlands, new riding, consisting of the City of Langford and the District of Highlands
Oak Bay-Gordon Head, no changes
Saanich North and the Islands, lost Brentwood Bay to Saanich South
Saanich South, gained Brentwood Bay from Saanich North and the Islands
Victoria-Beacon Hill, lost Victoria West to Esquimalt-Colwood
Victoria-Swan Lake, no changes
Nanaimo-Gabriola Island, new riding to contain Nanaimo's downtown
Nanaimo-Ladysmith, minor changes
Nanaimo-Oceanside, previously named Parksville-Qualicum
Courtenay-Comox, no changes
Cowichan Valley, gained Chemainus and Cherry Point for population balance
Mid Island-Pacific Rim, no changes
North Island, no changes

See also
 British Columbia Electoral Boundaries Commission
 2015 British Columbia electoral redistribution
 43rd British Columbia general election
 Elections BC

References

British Columbia, 2021
Electoral redistribution, 2021
2021 in Canadian politics
Electoral redistribution, 2021